The Ghost of Christmas Yet to Come is a fictional character in Charles Dickens's 1843 novella A Christmas Carol. The Ghost is one of three spirits which appear to miser Ebenezer Scrooge to offer him a chance of redemption.

Following a visit from the ghost of his deceased business partner Jacob Marley, Scrooge receives nocturnal visits by three Ghosts of Christmas, each representing a different period in Scrooge's life. The shrouded, ominous and silent Ghost of Christmas Yet to Come is Scrooge's last visitor, and shows him a vision of a Christmas Day in the near future after his own death.

Background 

By early 1843, Dickens had been affected by the treatment of the poor, and in particular the treatment of the children of the poor after witnessing children working in appalling conditions in a tin mine and following a visit to a ragged school. Indeed, Dickens himself had experienced poverty as a boy when he was forced to work in a blacking factory after his father's imprisonment for debt. Originally intending to write a political pamphlet titled, An Appeal to the People of England, on behalf of the Poor Man's Child, he changed his mind and instead wrote A Christmas Carol which voiced his social concerns about poverty and injustice.

Dickens's friend and biographer John Forster said that Dickens had 'a hankering after ghosts’, while not actually having a belief in them himself, and his journals Household Words and All the Year Round regularly featured ghost stories, with the novelist publishing an annual ghost story for some years after his first, A Christmas Carol, in 1843. In this novella, Dickens was innovative in making the existence of the supernatural a natural extension of the real world in which Scrooge and his contemporaries lived. Dickens making the Christmas Spirits a central feature of his story is a reflection of the early-Victorian interest in the paranormal. 

Unlike the previous two Christmas Spirits, the Ghost of Christmas Yet to Come follows in the tradition of Gothic literature, which Dickens had read as a teenager. Apart from A Christmas Carol, Dickens also incorporated the gloomy atmosphere and melodrama of Gothic literature into various of his other works, shifting them to a more modern period and an urban setting, for example in Oliver Twist (1837–1838), Bleak House (1854), Great Expectations (1860–1861) and the unfinished Edwin Drood (1870). As in A Christmas Carol, these novels juxtapose wealthy, ordered and affluent civilisation with the disorder and barbarity of the poor in the same metropolis.

Significance to the story 
Unlike the two previous Spirits who come at the stroke of one, the Ghost of Christmas Yet to Come makes its appearance on the last stroke of twelve, the Witching Hour. It is introduced as an ominous and silent figure: "...a solemn Phantom, draped and hooded, coming, like a mist along the ground, towards him... Scrooge feared the silent shape so much that his legs trembled beneath him, and he found that he could hardly stand when he prepared to follow it." 
When it came near him, Scrooge bent down upon his knee; for in the very air through which this Spirit moved, it seemed to scatter gloom and mystery. It was shrouded in a deep black garment, which concealed its head, its face, its form, and left nothing of it visible, save one outstretched hand. But for this, it would have been difficult to detach its figure from the night and separate it from the darkness by which it was surrounded.

The Spirit in its “dusky shroud” is a personification of Death, and while this may seem an odd choice to modern readers for a Christmas ghost, in the early Victorian era people would remember their deceased loved ones at Christmastime, which, being at the end of the year, was also a time for reflection. In his article 'What Christmas Is, As We Grow Older' published in Household Words in 1851, Dickens wrote, “Of all days in the year, we will turn our faces to that City [of the Dead] upon Christmas Day, and from its silent hosts bring those we loved, among us. Dickens described a similar Christmas spectre in his story ‘A December Vision’ (1850), which also had a slow and unwavering persistence and which also had a shaded face and ghostly eyes. 

Like the Future itself, the Ghost of Christmas Yet to Come is unknown, mysterious and silent, and Scrooge fears his message most of all. When the Spirit wishes Scrooge to look at something or to follow him, he simply points. The Victorians believed ghosts had the power to see the future, including people’s deaths, and in the novella the Ghost of Christmas Yet to Come reveals to Scrooge his own death. The Spirit shows Scrooge that his future fate is not set in stone or written on his gravestone but can be changed – by changing his actions in the present.

During the 1840s, the threat of typhus and cholera was very real for every one, high and low in London, and the Ghost of Christmas Yet to Come is a memento mori, a reminder of the inevitability of death, but also a reminder of the fear of death and dying – because with death comes a reckoning, leading either to eternal reward or to eternal punishment. The ghost of Jacob Marley in Stave I revealed to Scrooge which fate he can expect unless he changes his ways. The Spirit shows Scrooge how his own death will bring indifference to others at best and joy at its worst; that those who build up treasures on earth will find that these same treasures have no worth after death. The only sorrow the Spirit can show in connection with the death of the unknown man is the death of Tiny Tim, the two deaths being linked in a way as yet unknown to Scrooge. Without becoming benevolent and charitable and without accepting redemption and salvation Scrooge will suffer the same fate as Marley, weighed down by chains and cash boxes and ledgers and excluded from Heaven. He must accept and "honour Christmas in [his] heart".

Visions of the future 

In Stave IV, the Spirit takes Scrooge to locations around London, including the London Stock Exchange; Bob Cratchit's home; his own bedchamber, and Old Joe's rag-and-bone shop. In these scenes, Dickens uses mirroring, for as the Spirit reveals the visions of the future to Scrooge he fails to recognise what the reader has already seen - that Scrooge is seeing his own future; that the un-mourned dead man is himself; that the bedcurtains in the rag-and-bone shop are his; that the cheap funeral discussed by the city businessmen at the Exchange is his own; that he is the creditor whose death brings hope and relief to an indebted young couple. Scrooge struggles to understand the significance of these visions of the future, believing that the fate of the dead man in the bedchamber could be his own, and he implores the Spirit to reveal the identity of the dead man. In the final scene in Stave IV Scrooge finds himself in a churchyard where the Spirit points at a gravestone:

The Spirit stood among the graves, and pointed down to One. He advanced towards it trembling. The Phantom was exactly as it had been, but he dreaded that he saw new meaning in its solemn shape.

"Before I draw nearer to that stone to which you point," said Scrooge, "answer me one question. Are these the shadows of the things that Will be, or are they shadows of things that May be, only?"

Still, the Ghost pointed downward to the grave by which it stood.

"Men's courses will foreshadow certain ends, to which, if persevered in, they must lead," said Scrooge. "But if the courses be departed from, the ends will change. Say it is thus with what you show me."

The Spirit was immovable as ever.

Scrooge crept towards it, trembling as he went; and following the finger, read upon the stone of the neglected grave his own name, EBENEZER SCROOGE.

"Am I that man who lay upon the bed?", he cried, upon his knees.

The finger pointed from the grave to him, and back again.

"No, Spirit! Oh no, no!"

The finger still was there.

"Spirit!", he cried, tight clutching at its robe, "hear me. I am not the man I was. I will not be the man I must have been but for this intercourse. Why show me this, if I am past all hope?"

For the first time, the hand appeared to shake.

"Good Spirit," he pursued, as down upon the ground he fell before it: "Your nature intercedes for me, and pities me. Assure me that I yet may change these shadows you have shown me, by an altered life."

The kind hand trembled.

The Ghost of Christmas Yet to Come reveals to Scrooge the future consequences of his past and present actions: his lack of sympathy for the poor; his ill-treatment of his own clerk Bob Cratchit; that his own death will also result in the death of the Cratchits' disabled young son, Tiny Tim. Scrooge's past and present actions have left him "solitary as an oyster" and his lonely death is revealed, with no one to mourn and having become an opportunity for others to profit - if only with a free lunch. The last of the Spirits gives Scrooge the final chance at redemption, to start life anew in his last years, and to make reparation to his nephew Fred, to the Cratchits and to the poor of London - his "fellow passengers to the grave". Of course, like all people, Scrooge will eventually die, but from now to his final days Scrooge will ‘live in the Past, the Present, and the Future.'

Appearance in notable film and TV adaptations 

 In the 1951 film Scrooge, the Spirit (played by C. Konarski) is depicted as a shrouded figure with a single hand extended.
 In the 1983 animated film Mickey's Christmas Carol, the Ghost of Christmas Future reveals himself to be Pete (voiced by Will Ryan).
 In the 1984 made-for-television film, the Spirit (played by Michael Carter) creates an eerie metallic noise.
 In the 1988 film Scrooged, the Spirit is a shrouded figure with a skull-like television screen for a head and a skeletal hand.
 In the 1992 film The Muppet Christmas Carol, the Spirit is depicted as a large, faceless figure in a tattered black hood.
 In the 1999 made-for-television film, the Spirit (played by Tim Potter) has eyes that shine through his hood.
 In the 2000 UK television movie, the Ghost is played by Ben Inigo Jones. 
 In the 2004 film A Christmas Carol: The Musical, the spirit (played by Geraldine Chaplin) is depicted as a hag dressed in a white robe.
 In the 2009 film Disney's A Christmas Carol, the Ghost is depicted as a shadow of a huge cloaked figure.
 In the 2010 Doctor Who Christmas special, "A Christmas Carol", the character Kazran Sardick is depicted as the Ghost.
in the 2016 My Little Pony: Friendship Is Magic, episode A Hearth's Warming Tail, the Ghost of Christmas Yet-to-Come is portrayed by Princess Luna (played by Tabitha St. Germain).
 In the 2019 miniseries, the Ghost of Christmas Yet-to-Come is portrayed by Jason Flemyng.
 In the 2022 film Spirited, the Ghost is portrayed by former NBA player Loren Woods and voiced by Tracey Morgan

See also 
 Jacob Marley
 Ghost of Christmas Past
 Ghost of Christmas Present

Notes

References

Sources 

 
 
 
Dickens, Charles. A Christmas Carol (and Other Christmas Writings). Edited introduction by Michael Slater. Penguin Classics
Hearn, Michael P. (1989). The Annotated Christmas Carol / A Christmas Carol by Charles Dickens; illustrated by John Leech; with an introduction, notes and bibliography by Michael Patrick Hearn.  Avenel Books.  New York.  .

External links 
The illustrators of The Ghost of Christmas Yet to Come, Victorian Web Database

Literary characters introduced in 1843
A Christmas Carol characters
Christmas characters
Male characters in film
Male characters in literature
Fictional ghosts
Fictional personifications of death
Fictional mute characters
Fictional characters with precognition